Rock and Roll Road Trip with Sammy Hagar Presented by Mercury Insurance was an original music series on AXS TV hosted by Sammy Hagar. The series features Hagar traveling the country to interview and often perform with popular and influential musicians.

The following is a complete list of Rock and Roll Road Trip episodes.

Series overview

Episodes

Season 1 (2016)

Season 2 (2017)

Season 3 (2018)

Season 4 (2019)

Season 5 (2020)

References

External links 
 
 

Lists of American non-fiction television series episodes